Butler Community College (BCC) is a public community college in El Dorado, Kansas.

Campus
There are a number of branch campuses throughout the area, in Andover, Council Grove, Marion, McConnell, Rose Hill, and a number of distance-learning sites in high schools.

Academics
Butler is the second largest community college in Kansas, with 13,000 students annually across six campus location.  Most are commuters. The school is accredited by the Higher Learning Commission, the Accreditation Council of Business Schools and Programs, the National League of Nursing, and the Kansas State Board of Nursing.

History
In 1927, El Dorado Junior College was founded. The college name has evolved over the years: Butler County Junior College, Butler County Community Junior College, Butler County Community College (BCCC), then finally to its current name of Butler Community College.

The college briefly came into the national spotlight in the late 2000s when one of its students was murdered.

Jackie Vietti was school president from 1995 until her retirement in December 2012. In August 2013, Kimberly Krull became president of the college.

College leaders 
During the first 40 years of the college, Butler's leaders were known as the dean. That changed in 1963, as Edwin Walbourn was named President when the school became a community college.

Deans
 Earl Walker, 1927–1946
 Hubert A. Shumway, 1946–1947
 Max Beckford, 1947–1955
 Tilghman Aley, 1955–1960
 Edwin J. Walbourn, 1960–1963

Presidents
 Edwin J. Walbourn, 1963–1976
 Carl Heinrich, 1976–1987
 Walter Browe, 1987–1988 (interim)
 Rodney V. Cox Jr., 1988–1995
 Jackie Vietti, 1995–2012
 Karla Fisher, 2012–2013 (interim)
 Kimberly Krull, 2013–present

Athletics

The school mascot is the grizzly bear, colors are purple (PMS 2627) and gold (PMS 465 or 871), cross country, football, basketball (men and women), track, women's soccer, volleyball, baseball, and softball, as well as a spirit squad.

Butler has won 10 NJCAA national championships, including six in football (1981, 1998, 1999, 2003, 2007, and 2008). Butler also has won national titles in men's basketball (1953), men's cross country (1970, 1995), women's cross country (2002), and softball (2016).

Butler Softball has currently won 88 consecutive games, dating back to March 3, 2016 when the Grizzlies beat Barton Community College 9–1. This includes the 2016 NJCAA Div. I National Championship.

The softball team finished third nationally in 2013 after being ranked No. 1 nationally for much of the season. That team won a program-record 54 games (54–4).

The Grizzlies finished third in the 2008 NATYCAA standings, which award points to each sports team based on their finish at national competition. It is Butler's highest finish in the NATYCAA standings.

Women's soccer has been among the final four twice as they reached the national semifinals in 2013 and 2015 and has been to the national tournament in Melbourne, Fla. six straight years (2011–2016).

The baseball team finished third in the 1994 NJCAA Division I World Series in Grand Junction, Colo.

The women's basketball team was selected as an at-large team for the 2014 NJCAA Division I national tournament held in Salina. The Grizzlies won two games and reached round of eight before being beaten by Chipola (Fla.). The Grizzlies were 34–3 that season, a school-record for wins.

Troy Morrell was the head football coach from 2000–2014. He compiled a record of 154–22 in 15 seasons and won three national titles (2003, 2007, 2008) in that span. Morrell has since been inducted into the NJCAA Hall of Fame as well as the Kansas Sports Hall of Fame. Former Defensive Coordinator, Tim Schaffner was named head coach in 2015 after Morrell's resignation and led the team to the 2015 Jayhawk Conference championship.

Notable people
Notable faculty
 Jackie Vietti, BCC president from 1993 to 2012
Notable alumni

 Cara Gorges, beauty pageant contestant
 John Grange, member of Kansas House of Representatives from 2005 to 2013
 Stephen Jackson, NBA Player and Champion
 Roger Marshall, obstetrician, former US Rep for the Kansas 1st District (2017–2021), US Senator of Kansas
 Lee Nailon, professional basketball player, NBA player and 2007 Israeli Basketball Premier League MVP
 Dennis Rader, serial killer known as "BTK"
 David Rickels, professional mixed martial artist fighting in Bellator MMA
 Brent Sommerhauser, artist, sculptor, glassblower

References

External links
 
 Grizzly yearbook, 1928-2011 (Internet Archive)

 
Two-year colleges in the United States
Buildings and structures in Butler County, Kansas
Education in Butler County, Kansas
Educational institutions established in 1927
Community colleges in Kansas
NJCAA athletics
El Dorado, Kansas
1927 establishments in Kansas